Hachlaf is a surname. Notable people with the surname include:

Abdelkader Hachlaf (born 1978), Moroccan middle distance runner
Halima Hachlaf (born 1988), Moroccan middle distance runner